The Great Escape is an action-adventure stealth video game based on the 1963 movie of the same name. It was developed by UK-based developer Pivotal Games. The game was released on Xbox, Microsoft Windows and PlayStation 2.

Gameplay
There are four playable characters, from the film, each with a special ability.

MacDonald (Gordon Jackson's character), who can speak German to pass himself off as a guard.
Hendley (James Garner's character), who can pick pockets to get papers, keys, etc., and must also act as guide/escort to Blythe (Donald Pleasence's character)
Hilts (Steve McQueen's character), who can pick locks to get into buildings
Sedgwick (James Coburn's character), who can fix mechanical devices.

There are 18 levels in the game. Some of these recreate scenes from the movie, but most are original scenarios. The early levels of the game are all original scenarios, depicting the characters' first captures and their early escape attempts from other POW camps, all of which ultimately fail and lead to their being sent to Stalag Luft III (whereas the film began with the prisoners arriving at that camp). By contrast, the later levels of the game are nearly all based on scenes from the film, albeit significantly expanded, in particular in the case of Sedgwick, who is shown undertaking several missions for the French Resistance before escaping with their help into Spain.

The ending of the game is also changed so that all four playable characters escape, whereas in the film only Sedgwick escapes, with the other three being recaptured (and, in MacDonald's case, executed). In the game, Sedgwick escapes as he does in the film (extra levels in the game have him work as a saboteur for the French Resistance before they help him escape), Hendley & Blythe manage to fly safely to Switzerland, MacDonald escapes Germany in a cargo ship, and Hilts succeeds in jumping the border fence into Switzerland.

Despite the cover showing Hilts with a gun hiding from a guard in the camp, such a scene never occurs in either the game or the film. The front cover may have been inspired by a scene late in the film where Hilts, disguised in German uniform, holds a gun while hiding behind a shed after trying to escape a German patrol on a motorbike.

Cast information
Sound bites of Steve McQueen as Hilts were taken from the film and used in the game, famous lines such as "250", "Walking down the road" and "20 feet short" were used to recreate iconic scenes from the film. Two sounds bites of McQueen replying "Yeah" were also used to respond in the affirmative when talking to other characters.

The original film score by Elmer Bernstein is heard throughout the game and adds to the authenticity.

Reception

The Great Escape received "mixed" reviews on all platforms according to video game review aggregator Metacritic. In Japan, where the PlayStation 2 version was ported and published by Marvelous Entertainment under the name  on 14 October 2004, Famitsu gave it a score of 27 out of 40. Edge gave the Xbox version a score of four out of ten and said that it was "saved by a few good set-pieces and the licence, but it's hard not to feel hard done by. Those willing to endure yet another stealth game could find their morale ebbing away by the end of this."

References

External links

2003 video games
Action-adventure games
PlayStation 2 games
Stealth video games
Video games based on films
Video games developed in the United Kingdom
Video games set in Austria
Video games set in France
Video games set in Germany
Video games set in Switzerland
Windows games
World War II video games
Video games about Nazi Germany
Xbox games
MGM Interactive games